Ramsbottom is a town in the Metropolitan Borough of Bury, Greater Manchester, England, and includes the villages of Holcombe and Summerseat and the surrounding countryside.  The area is unparished, and it contains 52 listed buildings that are recorded in the National Heritage List for England.  Of these, one is listed at Grade II*, the middle grade, and the others are at Grade II, the lowest grade.  The area is partly agricultural, partly industrial, and partly residential.  The listed buildings include farmhouses and farm buildings, private houses and associated structures, churches and items in churchyards, a hotel, public houses, a hall, an engineering works and a mill, a former railway goods shed, a monument, and a telephone kiosk.


Key

Buildings

Notes and references

Notes

Citations

Sources

Lists of listed buildings in Greater Manchester
Buildings and structures in the Metropolitan Borough of Bury
Listed